Sagalassa is a genus of moths in the family Brachodidae.

Species
 Sagalassa aequalis Walker, 1862
 Sagalassa buprestoides Walker, 1864
 Sagalassa chrysauge Felder, 1875
 Sagalassa coleoptrata Walker, 1854
 Sagalassa cryptoleucella Walker, 1866
 Sagalassa cryptopyrrhella Walker, 1866
 Sagalassa falsissima Dognin, 1910
 Sagalassa lilacina Walsingham
 Sagalassa metallica Walker, 1856
 Sagalassa nephelospila Meyrick, 1912
 Sagalassa orthochorda Meyrick, 1922
 Sagalassa robusta Walker, 1856
 Sagalassa triphaenoides Butler, 1883
 Sagalassa valida Walker, 1856

Former species
 Sagalassa ambigua Turner, 1941
 Sagalassa ampla Turner, 1941
 Sagalassa androgyna Turner, 1913
 Sagalassa basichrysa Lower, 1916
 Sagalassa centropis Meyrick, 1907
 Sagalassa conspersa Turner, 1941
 Sagalassa desmotoma Lower, 1896
 Sagalassa diabolus Felder, 1875
 Sagalassa emplecta Turner, 1941
 Sagalassa episcota Lower, 1903
 Sagalassa eubrachycera Diakonoff, 1967
 Sagalassa heterozyga Turner, 1913
 Sagalassa holodisca Meyrick, 1907
 Sagalassa homotona Swinhoe, 1892
 Sagalassa isomacha Meyrick, 1925
 Sagalassa leucopis Meyrick, 1907
 Sagalassa lygropis Turner, 1913
 Sagalassa mesochrysa Lower, 1903
 Sagalassa micrastra Meyrick, 1907
 Sagalassa omichleutis Meyrick, 1907
 Sagalassa orthaula Meyrick, 1907
 Sagalassa pammelas Turner, 1913
 Sagalassa platysema Meyrick, 1921
 Sagalassa poecilota Turner, 1923
 Sagalassa resumptana Walker, 1863

References

Brachodidae